The Shanghai Defence Force was a tri-service military formation established by the British Government to protect European nationals and their property in Shanghai from Chinese nationalist forces during a period of tension in 1927.

History
Following the Xinhai Revolution in China in 1912 the country was divided between warlords. In January 1927 the British Concession in Hankou was invaded by nationalist forces undertaking their Northern Expedition which sought to unify China. Following a request from the Commander-in-Chief, China Station the Shanghai Defence Force was established under the leadership of Major-General John Duncan later that month amidst concerns that British lives and properties were at risk during the unrest in China at the time. King's College was requisitioned to be the quarters and hospital for the Shanghai Defence Force from February to December 1927. Royal Air Force China Command at Hong Kong was established to administer Royal Air Force units in the region. Tension finally eased in August of that year and troops were withdrawn towards the end of the year.

Formations
 13th Infantry Brigade
 1st Battalion, Middlesex Regiment
 1st Battalion, Cameronians (Scottish Rifles)
 1st Battalion, Border Regiment
 1st Battalion, Green Howards
 14th Infantry Brigade
 2nd Battalion Coldstream Guards
 1st Battalion, Bedfordshire and Hertfordshire Regiment
 2nd Battalion, Border Regiment
 1st Battalion, Devonshire Regiment
 20th Indian Infantry Brigade
 2nd Battalion, Gloucestershire Regiment
 2nd Battalion, Durham Light Infantry 
 4th Battalion, 1st Punjab Regiment
 3rd Battalion, 14th Punjab Regiment

See also
 Shanghai Volunteer Corps

References

Military units and formations established in 1927